Louis Yuen Siu-cheung (born on May 23, 1967) is a Hong Kong TVB actor.  He co-hosted the Super Trio series, Super Trio Supreme, in season 8 with Eric Tsang, Chin Kar-lok, and Wong Cho-lam. He also co-hosted the Fun with Liza and Gods series with Liza Wang, Johnson Lee and Wong Cho-Lam.
Finalist in the 1984 3rd TVB New Talent Singing Awards.

Filmography
Actor

Host

Films 
 I Love You, You're Perfect, Now Change! (2019)
 A Beautiful Moment (2018)
 Meow (2017)
 House of Wolves (2016)

Dubbing 

 Dub of War's Second Season Graduation Project- Spider-Man: No Way Home (2022)- Wong

References

1967 births
TVB actors
Living people
Hong Kong male television actors
Hong Kong television presenters
20th-century Hong Kong male actors
21st-century Hong Kong male actors
Hong Kong male comedians